Dipturus lamillai is a species of long-snout skate of the genus Dipturus. It was first described in 2019 after it was found in waters near the Falkland Islands in the southwest Atlantic Ocean. The population had previously been recorded as Zearaja chilensis, the Chilean yellow-nosed skate, but had been suspected to be a separate cryptic species, one that looks identical to another species but has distinct genetic information. It was named in honour of Julio Lamilla, a Chilean biologist.

References

Dipturus
Fish described in 2019
Fish of the Atlantic Ocean